Debra Lew Harder is an American pianist and radio announcer, host of the Metropolitan Opera radio broadcasts.

On September 21, 2021, Harder was named as the new host, taking the place of the retiring Mary Jo Heath. She was previously an announcer for classical music on radio station WRTI in Philadelphia, Pennsylvania.

References

External links
Debra Lew Harder - Official Website

Classical music radio presenters
Metropolitan Opera people
Radio and television announcers
Year of birth missing (living people)
Living people